Hayley Wildes (born 10 September 1996) is an Australian rules footballer who played for the Western Bulldogs in the AFL Women's competition. Wildes was drafted by the Western Bulldogs with their six selection and forty-fourth overall in the 2016 AFL Women's draft. She made her debut in the thirty-two point win against  at VU Whitten Oval in the opening round of the 2017 season. She played every match in her debut season to finish with seven games.

References

External links 

1996 births
Living people
Western Bulldogs (AFLW) players
Australian rules footballers from Victoria (Australia)
Victorian Women's Football League players